Sam McIntosh (born 13 July 1990) is an Australian Paralympic athlete who races in the T52 100m, 200m, and 400m events.  He holds 3 Australian National Records and 2 Oceania Records.  He represented Australia at the 2012 London Paralympic Games, 2016 Rio Paralympics and  2020 Tokyo Paralympics in athletics as well as the 2011, 2015, 2017, and 2019 Para Athletic World Championships.

Early life
McIntosh was born on 13 July 1990 in Geelong, the youngest of three children to Glenn and Jenny McIntosh.  He attended St. Thomas Primary School in Drysdale. In his youth, Sam showed an interest in individual sports and activities, such as swimming, karate, and BMX bike riding.  Sam swam at the state level and at the Victorian Country LC Championships.  Sam graduated with a VCE from Saint Ignatius College Geelong in 2008 after returning to school post-accident.

The Accident
In 2007, while riding a BMX bike on a family holiday in Coffs Harbour, he had an accident that left him a C6 quadriplegic.

While in rehabilitation, he was visited by a school friend's sister, fellow Paralympian, Jemima Moore, who encouraged him to explore para sport. Following his accident, he initially played wheelchair rugby.

On 31 December 2011, on a dance floor, his neck was broken for a second time.  He spent two weeks in hospital and three months doing rehabilitation before he was able to continue his athletics career. With six months between him and the 2012 London Paralympics, Sam was determined to recover, get back to training and represent his county.  He succeeded.

Athletics

McIntosh is a T52 classified athlete who competes in the 100 metre, 200 metre and 400 metre events.

McIntosh switched from wheelchair rugby to athletics following a meeting with Kaye Colman, the mother of Richard Colman. He started competing in 2009. In 2010, he was coached by Mandi Cole.  That year, he was able to purchase a racing wheelchair that fit him better. At the 2011 Australian National Titles, he earned a gold medal in the 100 metre event, and a silver medal in the 200 metre event.

In 2012, he participated in a national team training camp at the Australian Institute of Sport. He was selected to represent Australia at the 2012 Summer Paralympics in athletics in the 100 m and 200 m events.  He did not medal at the 2012 Games.

Sam became ill after arriving in Rio for the 2016 Rio Paralympics.  Although he was ill, he insisted on racing in the T52 100m event and he finished in fourth place. Just after crossing the finish line for the T52 100m finals, Beat Bösch mistakenly drifted into his lane and crashed into him.  Sam was upturned on the track and his racing chair was badly damaged. A medical team attended to him and due to health concerns and a concussion from the crash, Sam withdrew from the upcoming 400m event.

At the 2017 World Para Athletics Championships in London, England, he finished sixth in 100m T52  (18.69s (+0.4)) and ranked 12th in the Men's 400m T52. McIntosh was one of  three Geelong Para Athletes, as well as Martin Jackson and Jemima Moore, to be selected for the Championships.

At the 2019 World Para Athletics Championships in Dubai, UAE, he finished third in his 100m T52 heat, pushing him through to the finals where he placed sixth with a time of 17.69s, tying his season best.  This time was fast enough to make him eligible to be selected for the Tokyo 2020 Paralympics (official selections have yet to be made).

At the 2020 Tokyo Paralympics, he finished fourth in the Men's 100m T52 and finished fifth in his heat of the Men's 400m T52.

Records

Sam currently holds three Australian National Records and two Oceania Records.

Australian National Records

T52 100m:  17.07s (+1.9 m/s) (Canberra, Australia, January 21, 2020) Previously beating his own record of 17.30 from Arbon, Switzerland in 2015

T52 200m:  32.02s (+0.6 m/s) (Arbon, Switzerland, June 4, 2015)

T52 400m:  1:04.08s (Perth, WA, Australia, April 16, 2010)

Oceania Records

T52 100m:  17.07s (+1.9 m/s) (Canberra, Australia, January 21, 2020) Previously beating his own record of 17.39 from Canberra, Australia in 2016

T52 200m:  33.08s (+1.5 m/s) (Canberra, Australia, January 21, 2014)

Notes

External links
 
 
 Sam McIntosh at Australian Athletics Historical Results

Paralympic athletes of Australia
Living people
1990 births
Athletes (track and field) at the 2012 Summer Paralympics
Athletes (track and field) at the 2016 Summer Paralympics
Athletes (track and field) at the 2020 Summer Paralympics
Wheelchair category Paralympic competitors
Sportspeople from Geelong